Mullah Muhammad Daud Muzamil (died 9 March 2023) was a politician in the Islamic Emirate of Afghanistan who served as Governor of Balkh province. Prior to that, he served as Governor of Nangarhar province. He was a member of the Taliban.

Death
Muzamil was killed in a suicide attack that took place during a meeting inside the Balkh provincial office. Two civilians were also killed during the attack and four others injured. The Islamic State claimed responsibility for the attack.

References

20th-century births
2023 deaths
Taliban governors
Governors of Nangarhar Province
Governors of Balkh Province
Assassinated Afghan politicians
Deaths by suicide bomber
People killed by the Islamic State of Iraq and the Levant